Hilarographa fergussonana is a species of moth of the family Tortricidae. It is found on Fergusson Island in Papua New Guinea.

The wingspan is about 13 mm. The ground colour of the forewings is orange in form of radial strips at the base, transverse lines and spots near the middle. The specular area is yellow orange and the spots along termen are brown. The refractive elements are golden and pink. The hindwings are pale orange with a row of brown subterminal spots, a brown apical edge and a brownish anal field.

Etymology
The name refers to Fergusson Island.

References

Moths described in 2009
Hilarographini